Dahi Handi (also known as Gopal Kala or Utlotsavam)  is an entertainment and competitive event associated with Krishna Janmashtami, the Hindu festival celebrating the birth of Krishna.

During the event, which takes place during August or September on the day after Krishna Janmashtami. It involves communities hanging a clay pot filled with yogurt (dahi), butter, or another milk-based food at a convenient or tall height. Young men and boys form teams, make a human pyramid, and attempt to reach or break the pot. As they do so, people surround them, sing, play music, and cheer them on. It is a public spectacle, and an old tradition. More recently, Dahi Handi was lavished with media coverage, prize money and commercial sponsorships. The event is based on the legend of the god Krishna along with his friends mischievously stealing butter and other curd from neighbouring homes in Gokul as a child. He is also called Makhan chor or butter thief. The neighbours would try to avert his mischief by hanging the pots high out of his reach, but Krishna would find creative ways to reach them.

Legend

The child-god Krishna and his friends used to form human pyramids to break pots hung from the ceilings of neighbourhood houses, in order to steal curd and butter. This was in Vrindavana, a village in Uttar Pradesh, India, where Krishna was brought up. According to a legend, though there was an ample supply of milk products, the children were denied the nourishment during the evil king Kamsa's rule because the king seized the milk products produced. Krishna with his friends would steal and share the milk products. In the Hindu tradition, Krishna is also referred to as Makkan chor (butter thief).

Significance and description

In Maharastra, Janmashtami is celebrated as Dahi Handi (dahi: curd, handi: earthen pot) It is organized roughly every August. The festival Gokulashtami, known as Krishna Janmashtami in the rest of the country, is the celebration of Krishna's birth and Dahi Handi is part of it. The event involves making a human pyramid and breaking an earthen pot filled with milk, curd, butter, fruits and water which is hung at a convenient height, thus imitating the actions of child Krishna. Sometimes the prize money is added to the pot instead.

The terms govinda (also another name of Krishna) or govinda pathak are used to refer to the people who participate in forming this human pyramid. They practise in groups weeks before the actual event. These groups are called mandals and they go around the local areas, attempting to break as many pots as possible during the event. Pyramid formation needs coordination and focus; the lowest layers consist of the most people, preferably sturdy, while the middle layer players need to pay attention to those below as well as the others standing on their shoulders. The outer layer individuals need to focus on maintaining balance. As lighter people are needed higher up, the topmost layer usually has a single child. Breaking the pot usually ends up with the contents spilling over the participants. Traditionally, spectators threw water on the participants to deter them and people chant in Marathi "Ala re ala, Govinda ala" (govindas have arrived). The pyramid formation is often accompanied by crowds, music and dancing.

In Andhra Pradesh and Telangana this festival is celebrated as Utlotsavam (In Telugu Utti: a fibrous network sling to hang pots and Utsavam: Festival). At the famous Tirupati Venkateswara Temple, this ancient sport is celebrated with great fervor on navami (the day after krishna janmastami). The processional deities of Sri Krishna Swamy and Sri Malayappa Swamy will be taken in a procession around the temple to the place just in-front of temple where Utlotsavam will be performed. The Deities will be watching the sport being played by local youth who will be divided into groups to grab the Utti. Utti with prize money will be tagged to the end of 25 feet long wooden post which is smeared with sticky and other oily substances.

Celebration and economics
The participants form a pyramid consisting usually below 9-tiers, and are given three attempts to break the earthen pot. Every year thousands of people and hundreds of govinda teams gather at Mumbai and Thane's Dahi Handi events. , the prize money for the events usually range between – depending on the organizers and its sponsors. Each year, the prizes and scale of the celebrations increase due to the participation of political parties and commercialisation.

Local and state political parties like the Nationalist Congress Party (NCP),  Shiv Sena and Maharashtra Navnirman Sena (MNS), are active during this event, with each offering their own prize money. Each party sponsors its own set of mandals. Their involvement has increased in the 2000s, thereby increasing competition and prize money. Thus, numerous teams compete against each other in successive events for the prizes throughout the city. Actors from Bollywood, Marathi actors and singers  take part in this event. Some mandals even incorporated social messages like female foeticide or about the environment into their act; the Shiv Sena and MNS focus on Marathi culture. Some years, Castellers from Catalonia also take part in the competition.

In 2012, a mandal called Jai Jawan Govinda Pathak from Jogeshwari, Mumbai, made an entry into the Guinness World Record by forming a human pyramid of 9-tiers  at the Dahi Handi event held in Thane; the previous record was held by Spain since 1981. A lobby pushed for the possibility of making it an official sport in the same year, which critics said that it should remain just a street celebration.

Issues
The presence of these mass celebrations and mandals cause traffic congestion and problems like excessive littering. It also causes the issue of sound pollution, with the Supreme Court of India's prescribed guidelines being 55–65 decibels. 

Participation carries a high risk of mortality. The number of injuries increased due to higher competition since 2000. A report in 2012 from the Journal of Postgraduate Medicine, concluded that "There is a considerable risk of serious, life-threatening injuries inherent to human pyramid formation and descent in the Dahihandi festival". It recommended safety guidelines like reducing the height of the pot, preventing children from participating and using safety gear.

In 2012, over 225 govindas were injured with one casualty; this was higher than the previous year's 205. The government of Maharashtra banned children below 12 years from participating in 2014. The Bombay High Court later ruled in August that the minimum age should be raised to 18 years and height of the pyramid should be no more than 20 feet due to safety reasons. The Supreme Court of India refused to clarify the Bombay High Court thereby upholding it, but various organizations have re-appealed on different legal grounds. They state that olympic sports are dangerous and cause injuries too, but that is not sufficient grounds to ban Olympic participation. Banning a religious tradition, they state, infringes on the religious rights of a particular community. Several parties have defied the ban.

See also
Ganesh Chaturthi
Holi
Raksha Bandhan
Diwali
Castell

References

External links

 Making human pyramids pay in India
 Mumbai celebrates Dahi Handi festival

Hindu festivals
Religious festivals in India
Indian words and phrases
Indian folklore
Sport in Maharashtra
Human towers